The 1995 Tour de Hongrie was the 24th edition of the Tour de Hongrie cycle race and was held from 24 to 30 July 1995. The race started and finished in Budapest. The race was won by Sergei Ivanov.

General classification

References

1995
Tour de Hongrie
Tour de Hongrie